Florence Shirley (born Florence Isabell Splaine; June 5, 1892 – May 12, 1967) was an American stage and film actress.

Early years
Born in New York City, Shirley was the daughter of Francis Splaine.

Career 

Shirley began her stage career in Boston at age 14, when she said two lines in a Christmas play put on by John Craig's Castle Square Stock Company. Craig's interest led to her having children's parts in other plays, including boys' parts in productions of Shakespeare's plays. By 1914, she had become the ingenue of that company.

She enjoyed moderate success on Broadway. After the sinking of the Titanic in April 1912, she participated in a benefit concert for survivors held at the George M. Cohan Theatre. Her last Broadway appearance was in Alice in Arms (originally called Star in the Window) alongside Kirk Douglas.

She appeared in more than 50 films throughout her film career.

Personal life and death
On February 14, 1917, Shirley married efficiency engineer A. J. Koehler in New York City.

Shirley died in Hollywood, California.

Works

Selected filmography 
Shirley's film credits include the following: 
 Stars and Stripes Forever (Navy nurse), 1952 (uncredited)
 Deadline - U.S.A. (Miss Barndollar), 1952 (uncredited)
 The Dancing Masters (Matron), 1943 (uncredited)
 Let's Face It (Woman in Sun Shell Cafe), 1943 (uncredited)
 A Yank at Eton (Mrs. Sampson), 1942 (uncredited)
 Her Cardboard Lover (Casino patron watching chemin de fer game), 1942 (uncredited)
 We Were Dancing (Mrs. Charteris), 1942
 It Started with Eve (Bit Role), 1941 (uncredited)
 When Ladies Meet (Janet Hopper), 1941
 Three Sons o' Guns (Mrs. Tyler), 1941
 Nice Girl? (Woman Gossip), 1941 (uncredited)
 Lady with Red Hair (Daisy Dawn), 1940 (uncredited)
 Third Finger, Left Hand (Agnes, dinner guest), 1940 (uncredited)
 Pier 13 (Mrs. Forrest), 1940
 New Moon (Guest), 1940 (uncredited)
 Private Affairs (Mrs. Gilkin), 1940
 Opened by Mistake (Elizabeth Stiles), 1940
 I Take This Woman (Mrs. Leila Bettincourt), 1940 (uncredited)
 Balalaika (Lily Allison (Paris tourist)), 1939 (uncredited)
 Ninotchka (Marianne, Swana's Phone Friend), 1939 (uncredited)
 The Women (Miss Archer), 1939 (uncredited)

Broadway
Shirley's Broadway credits include the following productions:
 Alice in Arms (Daisy), 1945
 Take My Tip (Mrs. Dolly Browning), 1932
 Fast Service (Doris Borden), 1931
 Doctor X (Eleanor Stevens), 1931
 Embers (Germaine Bie), 1926
 The Poor Nut (Julia Winters), 1925
 The Locked Door (Muriel Walling), 1924
 My Aunt From Ypsilanti (Peggy), 1923
 Why Men Leave Home (Fifi), 1923
 Apple Blossoms (Mrs. Anna Merton), 1920
 Oh, Lady! Lady!! (Fanny Welch), 1918
 Anthony in Wonderland, 1917
 His Majesty Bunker Bean, 1916
 The Wall Street Girl (Pearl Williams), 1912

References

External links

 
 

1892 births
1967 deaths
American film actresses
American musical theatre actresses
American stage actresses
20th-century American actresses
20th-century American singers
20th-century American women singers